Ozan Evrim Özenç (born 7 January 1993, in Konak) is a Turkish footballer who plays as a goalkeeper for Altay.

Career

References

External links
 
 

1993 births
Living people
Turkish footballers
Süper Lig players
Antalyaspor footballers
Turkey youth international footballers
Turkey under-21 international footballers
People from Konak
Footballers from İzmir
Association football goalkeepers